Carolina Hidalgo Herrera (born 15 October 1982) is a Costa Rican politician from the Citizen Action Party. She was Speaker of the Legislative Assembly from 2018 to 2019.

Political career 
She was a candidate in the 2021 Citizens' Action Party presidential primary, but came in second place.

References

See also 

 List of presidents of the Legislative Assembly of Costa Rica

1982 births
Living people
Citizens' Action Party (Costa Rica) politicians
21st-century Costa Rican women politicians
21st-century Costa Rican politicians
Women legislative speakers
Presidents of the Legislative Assembly of Costa Rica

Members of the Legislative Assembly of Costa Rica
University of Costa Rica alumni